Ok-Hee Ku (1 August 195610 July 2013) was a South Korean professional golfer who played on the LPGA of Japan Tour and the LPGA Tour.

Ku won 23 times on the LPGA of Japan Tour between 1985 and 2005 and won once on the LPGA Tour in 1988, the first South Korean to do so.

She was president of the LPGA of Korea Tour from 2011 to 2012.

Ku died of a heart attack on 10 July 2013 at her residence on a golf course in Shizuoka, Japan, and was 56 years old.

Professional wins

LPGA of Japan Tour (23)
1985 (3) Kibun Ladies Classic, Tohato Ladies, Tohoku Queens
1987 (1) Tokai Classic
1990 (1) Ben Hogan & Itsuki Classic
1991 (2) SAZALE Queens, JLPGA Meiji Dairies Cup
1992 (1) Japan LPGA Championship
1993 (1) Karasumajo & Itsuki Classic
1996 (2) Toyo Suisan Ladies Hokkaido, Daio Paper Elleair Women's Open
1997 (2) Dunlop Twin Lakes Ladies Open, Daio Paper Elleair Women's Open
1998 (1) Chukyo TV Bridgestone Ladies Open
1999 (2) Nasuogawa Ladies, Miyagi TV Cup Dunlop Women's Open
2000 (3) Miyagi TV Cup Dunlop Women's Open, Itoen Ladies, Daio Paper Elleair Ladies Open
2002 (2) Fujisankei Ladies Classic, Japan LPGA Championship Konica Cup
2003 (1) Vernal Ladies
2005 (1) APiTa Circle K Sunkus Ladies

Tournament in bold denotes major championships in LPGA of Japan Tour.

LPGA Tour (1)

References

External links

South Korean female golfers
LPGA of Japan Tour golfers
LPGA Tour golfers
Golfers from Seoul
1956 births
2013 deaths